The killing of Jim Matthews was the September 2022 killing of news-radio anchor Jim Matthews at his home in Chesterfield Township, Michigan.

Jim Matthews
Jim Matthews was the overnight anchor at Metro Detroit's WWJ-AM known as "Newsradio 950". He had held that position for seven years. He was 57 years old at the time of his death. "Matthews" was the name he used professionally; he legal surname was "Nicolai".  He was a graduate of Lutheran High School in Harper Woods, Michigan.

Killing
On September 23, 2022, Matthews was reportedly bludgeoned with a hammer and/or stabbed to death at his home at the Hidden Harbor condominiums in Chesterfield Township.  Three family members were also injured in the incident.
 Matthews' girlfriend, Nicole Guertin age 35, was reportedly gagged and stabbed multiple times. Despite her injuries, Guertin was able to escape from the home carrying her five-year-old daughter.
 The couple's 10-year-old son was discovered by police in a closet at the home. He had sustained blunt force injury to his head and was hospitalized in critical condition.
 The couple's five-year-old daughter was also injured in the incident.

A fifth individual (the Accused) was discovered in the basement, reportedly overdosing. He was revived with Narcan and transported for medical attention.

In October 2022, Guertin told the Detroit Free Press that the Accused was a friend who woke her up and seemed depressed. According to police reports obtained by the paper, the Accused called Guertin at approximately 3 a.m. and came to the home at approximately 4 a.m. When Guertin eventually asked the Accused to leave, Guertin stated that the Accused "lost it", pulled a knife, cut her on the neck, and tied her hands and feet with zip ties. When Matthews arrived home from work in the morning, Williams began stabbing him and hitting him in the head with a hammer. The Accused told police he and Guertin were not dating and were just friends who "do drugs together"

Prosecution

Charges 
The Accused was charged on September 26, 2022, with one count of homicide-murder in the first degree, one count of homicide-felony murder, two counts of assault with intent to murder, and three counts of unlawful imprisonment. He has previous convictions for various violent crimes as well as narcotics related convictions

Preliminary examination
In February 2023, the Accused was bound over to stand trial for first-degree murder based on evidence presented at a preliminary examination in the Macomb County Circuit Court in New Baltimore, Michigan. Nichole Guertin testified that she had an intimate relationship with the Accused, that they smoked crack cocaine before Matthews came home from work, and that the Accused told her "when Jim gets home, I'm gonna kill him." Forensic evidence was also presented showing that Matthews was struck in the head with a hammer more than 20 times and that his throat was also slit.

References

2022 in Michigan
September 2022 crimes in the United States
Hammer assaults